Wilfred Griggs may refer to:
 C. Wilfred Griggs, professor of ancient scripture
 Wilfred E. Griggs, American architect